Dong Seoul College is a private technical college in Seongnam, South Korea.  The current president is Kwang-sup Yoo.

Location
The school is located in Bokjeong-dong of Sujeong-gu in the city of Seongnam. The campus lies between Bokjeong and Kyungwon University stations.

Departments and Divisions
There are 24 departments and 2 divisions offered by the Dong Seoul College which are Aerospace, Automobile & Mechanical Engineering, Electrical Information Control, Digital Electronics, Information And Communication, Computer Software, Architecture, Computer Information, Broadcasting & Media, Interior Design, Horology And Jewelry, Game Contents, Tourism, Practical Art, Industrial Design, Visual Communication Design, Fashion Design, Child Care & Education, Beauty Coordination, Silver Welfare, Airlines Service, Business Administration, Chinese Business, Sports Science, Acting, Applied Music and General Education.

History
Dong Seoul College was established in 1976 with 4 departments and 880 students.

Timeline

1970s
Je-Suk Institution for Education was founded with Park Duk Son as the first Chief Director. The first matriculation ceremony was held with 880 new students, the Building One and Two were completed and Park Yeou Soon was inaugurated as the first president. The Student Press was launched during these years.

1980s
The first commencement ceremony was held with 625 graduates. During these years the Broadcasting Studio, Computer Center, Building Three and Five, Administration Building were completed. The Student Guidance Center was opened and the Institute of Industrial Technology was established.

1990s
The name of the Institution for Education was changed to Hak-San. Building Six, Seven and the Hak San Library were completed in these years and the Student Union Building was opened. In 1998, the Language Teaching Center was established and the College names was changed to Dong Seoul College.

2000s
Dong Seoul College established sisterhood relationship with Zhejiang University Of Technology in China and a partnership was formed with Shenyang Ligong University of China. In 2008, the College established sisterhood relationship with Dalian University in China. During these years Dong Seoul College was selected as part of the Plan for the Development of Regional Human Resources by the Ministry of Labor, Plan for Industry-Academia Cooperation by Seongnam City, Plan for Youth Internships for SMEs by the Ministry of Labor and as part of the Plan for the Improvement of Educational Capability by the Ministry of Education, Science and Technology.

2010
Dong Seoul College was selected as a Class A University for the College Brand Support Project and as an excellent university for the project of the Improvement of Educational Capabilities.

Sister Universities
There are total of 21 sister universities.

China
Yantai Nanshan University
Hebei Normal University
Shenyang Ligong University
Shenyang University of Technology
Zhejiang University of Technology
Dillian University
Capital University of Economics and Business
Shenyang University

Japan
Kake Educational Institution
Shobi University
Kurashiki University of Science and the Arts
Chiba Institute of Science
Kibi International University
Kyushu University of Health and Welfare

United States
Long Island University
College of the Desert
Hawaii Pacific University
University of Guam

Australia
Queensland University of Technology
University of Newcastle
Bond University

Notable people
Heo Young-saeng, singer (SS501 and Double S 301)
Seo Kang-joon, actor and singer (5urprise)
Ong Seong-wu, actor and singer (Wanna One)

See also
List of colleges and universities in South Korea
Education in South Korea

References

External links

Universities and colleges in Gyeonggi Province
1978 establishments in South Korea
Universities and colleges in South Korea